The 2001 FIFA Confederations Cup was the fifth FIFA Confederations Cup and the third to be organised by FIFA. It was also the first in which the original hosts, Saudi Arabia, did not participate (they were the nation who founded the tournament, previously known as the King Fahd Cup). The tournament was played from 30 May to 10 June 2001, and co-hosted by South Korea and Japan, who were also hosts for the 2002 FIFA World Cup finals. It was won by France, beating hosts Japan 1–0, with a goal from Patrick Vieira.

By winning the tournament, France became the second team to simultaneously be World Cup champions, continental champions and Confederations Cup winners, after Brazil in 1997.

The eight teams were split into two groups of four, in which each team plays each of the others once, with the top two in each group advancing to the semi-finals.

Qualified teams

Venues

Match referees

Africa
 Gamal Al-Ghandour
 Felix Tangawarima
Asia
 Ali Bujsaim
 Lu Jun
Europe
 Hugh Dallas
 Hellmut Krug
 Kim Milton Nielsen

North America, Central America and Caribbean
 Benito Archundia
 Carlos Batres
Oceania
 Simon Micallef
South America
 Byron Moreno
 Óscar Ruiz

Squads

Group stage

Group A

Group B

Knockout stage

Semi-finals

Third place play-off

Final

Awards

Statistics

Goalscorers
A total of 31 goals were scored by 24 different players. None of them are credited as an own goal.

2 goals

 Shaun Murphy
 Eric Carrière
 Robert Pires
 Patrick Vieira
 Sylvain Wiltord
 Takayuki Suzuki
 Hwang Sun-hong

1 goal

 Josip Skoko
 Clayton Zane
 Washington
 Carlos Miguel
 Ramon
 Bernard Tchoutang
 Patrick M'Boma
 Steve Marlet
 Nicolas Anelka
 Youri Djorkaeff
 Marcel Desailly
 Shinji Ono
 Akinori Nishizawa
 Hiroaki Morishima
 Hidetoshi Nakata
 Yoo Sang-chul
 Víctor Ruiz

Tournament ranking

References

External links

FIFA Confederations Cup Korea/Japan 2001, FIFA.com
2001 FIFA Confederations Cup Official Site (Archived)
FIFA Technical Report
Regulations

 
2001
2001
2001
2001 in Japanese football
2001 in South Korean football
2001 in Australian soccer
Brazil at the 2001 FIFA Confederations Cup
2000–01 in French football
2000–01 in Mexican football
2001 in Canadian soccer
2001 in Cameroonian football
May 2001 sports events in Asia
June 2001 sports events in Asia
2001 in association football